Juan Ramón López Muñiz (born 2 November 1968) is a Spanish former footballer who played as a central defender, currently a manager.

Playing career
Muñiz was born in Gijón, Asturias. During his playing days, he represented hometown club Sporting de Gijón (making his first-team debut in the 1991–92 season, at already 23), Rayo Vallecano – scoring four goals from 40 appearances during 1998–99, which granted the Madrid side La Liga promotion via the playoffs even though they finished fifth – and CD Numancia.

Muñiz retired at the end of the 2001–02 campaign at the age of 33, as the team from Soria could only finish in 17th position in Segunda División. In 11 years as a professional, he appeared in 332 games and scored ten times (234 matches and six goals in the top flight).

Coaching career
Muñiz started as an assistant manager at Málaga in 2003, under Juande Ramos. His first head coach experience arrived in early 2006 with lowly UD Marbella, and he subsequently returned to Málaga as the main manager for two seasons, achieving a runner-up place in 2008 and thus promoting the Andalusians to the top tier after a two-year hiatus.

In July 2008, Muñiz switched to fellow league team Racing de Santander. At the season's end, he was released from contract and promptly returned to Málaga, replacing Antonio Tapia who took over relegated neighbours Real Betis.

In late June 2010, after leading Málaga to the 17th position, last above the relegation zone, Muñiz was sacked. Shortly after, he rejoined Ramos at FC Dnipro Dnipropetrovsk.

Muñiz was appointed AD Alcorcón manager on 8 June 2015, after four years in Ukraine. Roughly one year later, he signed with fellow division two club Levante UD, achieving promotion at the first attempt as champions.

On 20 June 2018, Muñiz returned to Málaga for a third spell after agreeing to a two-year contract. He was dismissed the following 14 April, following a 1–2 home loss against Extremadura UD.

On 5 July 2020, after more than a year without a club, Muñiz took charge of Deportivo Alavés in the top division until the end of the campaign.

Managerial statistics

Honours
Levante
Segunda División: 2016–17

References

External links

1968 births
Living people
Spanish footballers
Footballers from Gijón
Association football defenders
La Liga players
Segunda División players
Segunda División B players
Tercera División players
Sporting de Gijón B players
CD Izarra footballers
Sporting de Gijón players
Rayo Vallecano players
CD Numancia players
Spanish football managers
La Liga managers
Segunda División managers
Segunda División B managers
Málaga CF managers
Racing de Santander managers
AD Alcorcón managers
Levante UD managers
Deportivo Alavés managers
Spanish expatriate sportspeople in Ukraine